Powder Horn Pond is a lake in Plymouth County, Massachusetts.

Powder Horn Pond has an outline in the shape of a powderhorn, hence the name.

References

Ponds of Plymouth, Massachusetts
Ponds of Massachusetts